Whiteway may refer to:

Places
 Whiteway, Newfoundland and Labrador, Canada
 Whiteway (hundred), Dorset, England, United Kingdom
 Whiteway Colony, Cotswolds, England, United Kingdom
 Whiteway, Bath, Somerset, England, United Kingdom
 Whiteway, Kingsteignton, a historic estate in Devon
 Whiteway House, Chudleigh, a historic estate in Devon

Other uses
 Whiteway (surname)

See also
 Goldway (disambiguation)
 Greenway (disambiguation)
 Redway (disambiguation)
 Yelloway